John Layton (August 7, 1912 – October 5, 1989) was an American sports shooter. He competed in the 25 m pistol event at the 1948 Summer Olympics.

References

1912 births
1989 deaths
American male sport shooters
Olympic shooters of the United States
Shooters at the 1948 Summer Olympics
Sportspeople from Washington, D.C.